Cornelius Jakhelln (born 31 August 1977 in Kristiansand), né Cornelius Brastad, also known under the nom de plume Cornelius von Jackhelln, is a Norwegian vocalist, guitarist, musician, writer and poet.

Biography

Musician
Born as Cornelius Brastad in Oslo to parents Arvid Brastad, an accountant, and Harriet Qvenild, a social worker, he changed his last to Jakhelln as an adult. He is currently residing in Berlin. He was 18 years old when he and Lars "Lazare" Nedland formed the avant-garde metal band, Solefald. Along with being a lead vocalist, guitarist, bassist and composer in the band, he also handles the vast majority of lyric writing for the band. Solefald has since released one demo and seven full-length albums. In December 2005, the band was nominated for the Norwegian Alarm award for best metal album for the album, Red For Fire: An Icelandic Odyssey Part 1.

Cornelius' first time recording with a band other than Solefald was in July 1999, when Cornelius performed guest vocals for the gothic metal band Monumentum for the songs "Black And Violet", a cover of the Italian band Death SS, and "The Colour of Compassion". These recordings were released in 2004 on the Monumentum compilation album, Metastasi.

In 2003, Jakhelln began working on a new band. The name chosen was Sturmgeist, and the band plays an experimental style of black/thrash metal with lyrics sung in English, Norwegian, and German about Germanic mythology, war, and recitations of Goethe poetry. On January 24, 2005, Sturmgeist released their first full-length, entitled Meister Mephisto on the record label, Season of Mist. Since then, Sturmgeist has gone on a small European tour, and had recruited two more official members, John "Panzer" Jacobsen on guitar, and Christian "Anti Christian" Svendsen on drums, ending the band's time as a solo project. Sturmgeist's second full-length, entitled Über, was released October 16, 2006 through Season of Mist. His third album released under the Sturmgeist name was released in 2009, entitled Manifesto Futurista.

On August 26, 2005, Cornelius also announced on his official website that he would finally be recording an electronica album in Sofia, Bulgaria that he had been planning for six years. He has described the project as a combination of electronica, darkwave, hip hop, drum'n'bass and black metal.
The album, entitled My Only Drug Is Madness was released in 2007, under the band G.U.T, meaning Grace Under Torture. He got the phrase from a Thomas Mann short story entitled Der Tod in Venedig.

Writer
Aside from being a musician, Cornelius made his debut as a writer in 2001. He has had many writings published in newspapers and magazines and a tetralogy of poems entitled Quadra Natura for which he was deemed the winner of a national Scandinavian novel writing contest in 2007. The third volume of this four-book collection, entitled Fagernorn. Quadra Natura 0111 was released on March 16, 2006. He is also involved with a Paris-based literary review entitled Avant-poste, which was nominated for the French CNOUS annual award, as one out of ten cultural projects. He is also writing the libretto for a contemporary opera telling a story from the pagan times of the North.
He has continued to have a successful career as an author and was quoted in an interview stating "Being a writer is my job. And my music is… It's like a "Nebenjob", as you would say in Germany. A passion."

Education
Cornelius has a master's degree in philosophie/lettres modernes from University of Paris IV: Paris-Sorbonne and a master's degree in the philosophy of cognitive science with a minor in aesthetics from the University of Sussex. He is currently pursuing a PhD in philosophy and cognitive science from École des hautes études en sciences sociales and a PhD in philosophy from the University of Oslo.

Discography

With Solefald 

 Jernlov (demo) (1996)
 The Linear Scaffold (1997)
 Neonism (1999)
 Pills Against The Ageless Ills (2001)
 In Harmonia Universali (2003)
 Red For Fire: An Icelandic Odyssey Part 1 (2005)
 Black For Death: An Icelandic Odyssey Part 2 (2006)
 The Circular Drain (2008)
 Norrøn Livskunst (2010)
 World Metal: Kosmopolis Sud (2015)

 With Sturmgeist 

 Meister Mephisto (2005)
 Über (2006)
 Manifesto Futurista (2009)
 Operation Zion (2017)

 With G.U.T 

 My Only Drug Is Madness'' (2007)

As guest musician 

 Monumentum: sang on the songs "Black And Violet" and "The Colour of Compassion" on the album, Metastasi.

Books published
 Gebura Muse. Quadra Natura 0001 August 23, 2001 at Oslo editor Aschehoug
 Yggdraliv. Quadra Natura 0011 May 19, 2004 at Oslo editor Tiden
 Fagernorn. Quadra Natura 0111 March 15, 2006 at Oslo editor Tiden
 Gudenes fall 2007
 Rikke gidder ikke! 2008 Cappelen Damm
 Galderhug. Quadra Natura 1111 2008 Cappelen Damm
 Vougesville 2009 Cappelen Damm
 Trisyn 2010 Samlaget
 Kosmopolis November 2, 2011 Samlaget
 Raseri. En hvitings forsøk på en selvbiosofi November 21, 2011 Cappelen Damm
 Umgangskrigen October 22, 2013 Cappelen Damm

References

External links 
 Official Cornelius Jakhelln Myspace Page
 Solefald Official Homepage
 Sturmgeist Official Homepage
 G.U.T. Official Homepage

1977 births
Living people
Norwegian rock singers
Norwegian black metal musicians
21st-century Norwegian poets
Norwegian male poets
Norwegian male guitarists
Norwegian rock guitarists
Musicians from Oslo
Norwegian multi-instrumentalists
Date of birth missing (living people)
21st-century Norwegian male writers
21st-century Norwegian singers
21st-century Norwegian guitarists
21st-century Norwegian male singers